Fyodor Mikhailovich Nikitin (May 3, 1900 in Lokhvytsia – July 17, 1988 in Moscow) was a Soviet film and theater actor. People's Artist of the RSFSR. Winner of two Stalin Prizes first degree (1950, 1951).

Selected filmography
Katka's Reinette Apples (1926)
The House in the Snow-Drifts (1928)
My Son (1928)
Fragment of an Empire (1929)
Ivan Pavlov (1949)
Mussorgsky (1950)
Rimsky-Korsakov (1953)
Heroes of Shipka (1955)
Barrier of the Unknown (1961)
Come Here, Mukhtar! (1964)
A Winter Morning (1967)
 Funny Magic  (1969) 
The Days of the Turbins (1976)
Sweet Woman (1977)
The Dog in the Manger (1978)
Pugachev (1978)
Among Grey Stones (1983)
And Life, and Tears, and Love (1983)

References

External links
 
 Чтобы помнили
 Fyodor Nikitin at the RusKino

1900 births
1988 deaths
People from Lokhvytsia
Soviet male stage actors
Soviet male film actors
People's Artists of the RSFSR
Stalin Prize winners
Academic staff of the Gerasimov Institute of Cinematography
Burials at Vagankovo Cemetery